Brampton is a historic home located at Chestertown, Kent County, Maryland.  It is a  transitional Greek Revival / Italianate-influenced dwelling built about 1860. The main section of the house is a three-story structure, constructed of brick with a symmetrical five-bay-wide facade and a depth of two bays. A two-story frame wing extends from the rear.

It was listed on the National Register of Historic Places in 1983.

References

External links
, including photo from 1987, at Maryland Historical Trust

Chestertown, Maryland
Houses on the National Register of Historic Places in Maryland
Houses in Kent County, Maryland
Houses completed in 1860
Greek Revival houses in Maryland
Italianate architecture in Maryland
National Register of Historic Places in Kent County, Maryland